Cuba competed at the 2022 World Athletics Championships in Eugene, United States, from 15 to 24 July 2022. The Cuban Athletics Federation had initially entered 16 athletes, but ended up competing with 14 of them after the withdrawals of Yorgelis Rodríguez and Yiselena Ballar.

It was the first time that Cuba closed its participation in the World Athletics Championships without winning a medal. However, 4 Cuban athletes were among the top 8 in their respective competitions, accumulating a total of 15 points that placed Cuba in 29th place in the overall placing table.

Team
Originally, Cuba announced a team conformed by 14 athletes qualified for the World Athletics Championships, which was later expanded to 16 athletes with Mario Díaz (discus throw) and Yiselena Ballar (javelin throw) being included. The Cuban team was reduced to 14 athletes after the withdrawals of Yorgelis Rodríguez (heptathlon) and the javelin thrower Yiselena Ballar, the first one due to an injurie and Ballar after deserting from the Cuban team in Miami before traveling to Eugene, the host city.

Results 
Cuba entered 16 athletes.

Men 
Track events

Field events

Women
Track events

Field events

Combined events – Heptathlon

References

Nations at the 2022 World Athletics Championships
World Athletics Championships
2022